Fonseca  may refer to :

People 

 Fonseca (surname)
 Fonseca (singer), Colombian music artist

Music 

 Fonseca (album), an album by the eponymous Colombian artist Fonseca
 "Naam Hai Mera Fonseca", song from the 1991 Indian film Jo Jeeta Wohi Sikandar

Other 

 Fonseca (cigar brand), two brands of Cuban and Dominican cigars
 Fonseca (port), brand of Portuguese port wine
 Fonseca, La Guajira, town and municipality in Colombia
 Fonseca Atlético Clube, a Brazilian football (soccer) club
 Gulf of Fonseca, gulf in Central America
 Mossack Fonseca, a Panamanian law firm